The BILBY Awards are organised annually by the Queensland Branch of the Children's Book Council of Australia. The name of the award, BILBY, is an acronym of 'Books I Love Best Yearly'.

These awards are children's choice awards.  Each year Queensland children are asked to nominate their favourite book that they have read in the past year; only the winners from the previous two years are excluded from nomination.  The nominations are made in three readership categories (see below). The nomination process is the first phase of the awards.

In each category, around five of the most popularly nominated books are grouped into shortlists. In the second phase of the awards students are encouraged to read the books from the list in their readership category and vote for their favourite title.  The book receiving the most votes is declared the winner in its category.

Award category and description
Prior to 1997 there were three Awards categories for primary school readers – Read Alone, Read Aloud and Read Australian – and one category for Secondary. In 1997 a readership format was introduced, though the Early Readers category was first called the Picture Book category, then the Early Childhood category [see below].

Currently there are three categories:

Early Readers – for books for readers under 8 years old
Younger Readers – for books for readers between 8 and 12 years old
Older Readers – for books for readers over 12 years old.

List of BILBY Award winners

Early Readers Award
Note: Before 2001, this award was called the "Early Childhood" (1990–1999), "Picture Book" (1998–1997) and "Read Alone" (1996–1990) awards.

Younger Readers Award
Note: Before 1997, this award was called the "Read Aloud Award".

Older Readers Award

Read Australia Award

See also

 List of Australian literary awards
 List of CBCA Awards

Notes

References
 Bilby Award website
 Bilby Award website - Previous Winners
 CBCA Awards

Children's Book Council of Australia
Australian literary awards